KMZ may refer to:

 Keyhole Markup Language files when compressed

Organizations 
 Kievskiy Mototsikletniy Zavod, a Soviet / Ukrainian maker of the Dnepr series of motorcycles
 Kovrovskiy Mekhanicheskiy Zavod, a Soviet / Russian weapon manufacturer and former maker of the AEK-971 series of rifles
 Krasnogorskiy Zavod (formerly known as Krasnogorskiy Mekhanicheskiy Zavod), a Soviet / Russian maker of optics and cameras
 Különleges Műveleti Zászlóalj, the Special forces of the Hungarian Army
 Kyoto Municipal Zoo, a small 3.4-hectare (8.4-acre) zoo located in Sakyō ward, Kyoto and was established in 1903, making it the second oldest zoo in the country after Ueno Zoo in Tokyo

People 
 Khyril Muhymeen Zambri (born 1987), Malaysian footballer who plays as a striker for Negeri Sembilan FA. He also a winger for Malaysia national, Malaysia U-23 and former Malaysia U-20 squad. He scored 3 league goals in his debut season (2005)
 Klaus Martin Ziegler (1929–1993), German choral conductor, organist and Protestant church musician
 Karl Michael Ziehrer (1843–1922), Austrian composer. In his lifetime, he was one of the fiercest rivals of the Strauss family; most notably Johann Strauss II and Eduard Strauss.
 K M Ziehrer, abbreviation for the above
 Kenneth Zeichner (1947-), Hoefs-Bascom Professor of Teacher Education and Associate Dean for Teacher Education, University of Wisconsin–Madison, Madison, Wisconsin, United States
 Kenneth M. Zeichner, fuller name for the above

Other 
 KHL Medveščak Zagreb, a Croatian ice hockey team that currently plays in the Bobrov Division in the Kontinental Hockey League
 KHL Mladost Zagreb, a Croatian ice hockey team that currently plays in the Croatian Ice Hockey Championship.
 Khatti Meethi Zindagi, a Hum TV comedy drama which was aired from 26 July 2011 to 12 September 2011 starring Fahad Mustafa and Eshita Mehboob in lead roles
 Khorasani Turkic (ISO code kmz), a Turkic language spoken in Iran